Kementerian Perhubungan may refer to:

 Ministry of Communications (Brunei), a government ministry in Brunei
 Ministry of Transportation (Indonesia), a government ministry in Indonesia